Ronald Daian Fagundez Olivera (born May 12, 1979 in Montevideo is a Uruguayan footballer who previously played in midfield for PSIS Semarang. His close friend is Christian Gonzalez, they always play at the same club since he first played in Liga Indonesia. But since the 2009-10 season, they decide to play for two different clubs.

References

External links 
 Profile at Liga Indonesia Official Site
 

Uruguayan footballers
Living people
Footballers from Montevideo
Persisam Putra Samarinda players
Persik Kediri players
Expatriate footballers in Indonesia
1979 births
Liga 1 (Indonesia) players
Association football midfielders